Son of a Bitches Brew is an album by Acid Mothers Temple & the Melting Paraiso U.F.O., released in 2012. The album is available on CD or as a limited edition double-LP (500 copies) on blue and salmon vinyl. This album also marks the return of former vocalist, Cotton Casino.

Recording
Son of a Bitches Brew was recorded and mixed without the use of computers or hard drive based recorders.

The title, music, and artwork are an adaption of the 1970 Miles Davis electric period album Bitches Brew.

Track listing

Personnel
 Tsuyama Atsushi - Bass, Soprano saxophone, nei, pungi, alto recorder, voice
 Shimura Koki - drums
 Kawabata Makoto - guitar, electric piano, electronics, fuzz-otamatone, tape machine, yanquin, tanbura
 Higashi Hiroshi - synthesizer
 Tabata Mitsuro - guitar, guitar synthesizer on Tabata Mitsuru
 Cotton Casino - space whisper

Additional musicians
 Tabla Man - tabla on Tabata Mitsuru
 Stoo Odom - voice on Son Of A Bitches Brew

References

Acid Mothers Temple albums
2012 albums
Important Records albums